The Nightmare Lands is an accessory for the 2nd edition of the Advanced Dungeons & Dragons fantasy role-playing game, published in 1995.

Contents
The mist-shrouded netherworld of the Nightmare Lands lies on the borders of Ravenloft's Demiplane of Dread. Here, the Nightmare Court seeks out and traps dreamers in "dreamscapes", where their secret feelings are amplified to intolerable proportions so that the Court can feed on their fears.  Such dreamers are mentally assaulted nightly, and rapidly become insane unless the Nightmare being conducting the torture can be defeated.

The Nightmare Lands includes four books: "Book One: Journal of Doctor Illhousen", "Book Two: Rules of Dreams and Nightmares", "Book Three: Book of Nightmares" and the "Monstrous Supplement". The "Journal of Doctor Illhousen" introduced players to the concept of Nightmare adventures, and tells them how to reach the Nightmare Lands - both physically and as dream beings - in order to aid those held by the Nightmare Court. The journal outlines the reality shifting nature of this world. The "Rules of Dreams and Nightmares" fully explains the complexities of Nightmare adventures, as well as the key principle of Mental Fortitude, which is a character's self-confidence in the character's "dreamself"; Mental Fortitude is increased by facing the character's worst nightmare, eventually allowing the character to break free of the Court. The "Book of Nightmares" and "Monstrous Supplement" combine to provide an off-the-shelf scenario for parties adventuring in the Nightmare Lands.

Publication history
The Nightmare Lands was designed by Shane Lacy Hensley with additional design and editing by Bill Slavicsek, and was published by TSR, Inc. in 1995. The box cover artist was Den Beauvais, and the book cover and interior artist was John Snyder.

Reception
Trenton Webb reviewed The Nightmare Lands for Arcane magazine, rating it a 7 out of 10 overall. He refers to the "Journal of Doctor Illhousen" as "sketchy and theoretical", and felt that the "Book of Nightmares" and the "Monstrous Supplement" together "flesh out the Nightmare Lands into a truly horrific place to explore (and to DM)". He comments on the set as a whole: "The ideas behind the Nightmare Lands are intriguing and exciting. They provide an arena in which a party of any level can truly be tested." He felt that the appeal of the Nightmare Court was "limited by its inevitable association with the gothic Ravenloft", but that in this setting "it works well and all Ravenloft DMs should be encouraged to give their parties a bad night's sleep every once in a while". He cautions that the ready-to-run scenario Nightmares "may not sit readily with heroes from other places and planes in the multiverse". Webb outlines his concerns with the running of a Nightmare Lands campaign, where "the worst problems can arise. Mental Fortitude is a good system, but it requires better examples, better explanation and easy-access tables or checklists before it can function effectively. Further, the very plumed nature of Nightmare reality causes continued questions for the DM and impairs the necessary suspension of disbelief for the players." He concludes the review by saying: The Nightmare Lands is a brave attempt to add another element to D&D adventures. It conjures a scary new world where absolutely anything and everything can happen. It's a place I'd love to visit as a player - but I wouldn't want to live there."

Reviews
Dragon #227

References

Ravenloft supplements
Role-playing game supplements introduced in 1995